Choreutis minuta is a moth in the family Choreutidae. It was described by Alexey Diakonoff and Yutaka Arita in 1979. It is found on the Ryukyu Islands.

References

Choreutis
Moths described in 1979